Crappin' You Negative is the third full-length album from The Grifters and was released on Shangri-La Records. The album was reissued as a remastered version in 2016, by Fat Possum Records.

Track listing

Album credits

Grifters

 Stan Gallimore
 Tripp Lamkins
 David Shouse
 Scott Taylor

Additional musicians
 David Hall – Didgeridoo on Piddlebach
 Joseph Pegram (611) – Moaning on Piddlebach
 John Stivers (Impala) – Guitar on Here Comes Larry

Additional information
 Cover art by Tripp Lamkins
 Back cover and interior art by David Hall
 Graphic design by Paul W. Ringger Jr.
 Recorded at Easley Studios by The Grifters and Doug Easley and Davis McCain
 "Dead Already", "Arizona" and "Piddlebach" recorded at Scott's on 4-track
 "Here Comes Larry" recorded at Easley's on 4-track
 "Black Fuel Incinerator" rhythm section recorded on 4-track in a Memphis parking garage across the street from The Flower Shop

Album trivia
 The CD also carries the inscription of "Doink Records, 1993" under the © & ℗

References

Grifters (band) albums
1994 albums